Montana Highway 35 (MT 35) is an approximately   state highway in the west of the US state of Montana. It begins at U.S. Highway 93 in Polson in the Flathead Indian Reservation and ends at U.S. Highway 2 in Evergreen, the eastern portion of the city of Kalispell. As well as serving the townships along the eastern shore of Flathead Lake, it also serves as a de facto alternative route of US 93 between Polson and Kalispell.

Route description

MT 35 begins within the Flathead Indian Reservation, in the eastern outskirts of Polson, at an intersection with US 93. Initially, the highway heads east in a straight line. After a few miles, the road takes an abrupt turn northwards as it meets the foothills of the Mission Mountains. Passing Flathead Lake's East Bay, it then forms the eastern boundary of the community of Finley Point. Meeting Skidoo Bay of the lake, MT 35 is then squeezed between the shoreline on its left and the mountain range on its right and is forced by the topography to wind its way northwards between the two. After leaving the Flathead Indian Reservation, the road passes through the community of Woods Bay before crossing from Lake to Flathead County. Very soon afterwards, the highway enters Bigfork and intersects Secondary Highway 209 (S-209), the "Ferndale cutoff", before crossing the Swan River, one of Flathead Lake's tributaries. On the northern outskirts of Bigfork, MT 35 meets the ends of MT 83 and MT 82 in quick succession, before continuing northwards amidst farmland. After zigzagging to the northwest through the community of Creston, MT 35 reaches Haines Junction, the intersection with S-206, which allows motorists to shortcut to the communities further upstream along the Flathead River. MT 35 heads west from this junction and crosses the Flathead River into Evergreen, and intersects with Helena Flats Road and S-317 just before reaching its northern terminus at US 2 soon afterwards; traffic travelling straight-ahead from this point moves onto US 2 westbound towards Kalispell.

Major intersections

References

External links

035
Transportation in Lake County, Montana
Transportation in Flathead County, Montana